Henry Dickinson Green (May 3, 1857 – December 29, 1929) was an American politician who served as a Democratic member of the U.S. House of Representatives for Pennsylvania's 9th congressional district from 1899 to 1903.

Early life and education
Henry D. Green was born in Reading, Pennsylvania. He attended the public schools, and graduated from Reading High School in 1872 and Yale College in 1877. He studied law, was admitted to the Berks County bar in 1879 and commenced practice in Reading.

Career
He was a member of the Pennsylvania State House of Representatives for the Berks County district from 1883 to 1886.  He served as a member of the Pennsylvania State Senate for the 11th district from 1889 to 1896. During the Spanish–American War, he served as captain of Company G, Ninth Regiment, Pennsylvania Volunteers. He was a delegate to the 1900 Democratic National Convention.

Green was elected as a Democrat to the Fifty-sixth Congress to fill the vacancy caused by the death of Daniel Ermentrout. He was reelected to the Fifty-seventh Congress. He was not a candidate for renomination in 1902. He worked as editor of the Reading Telegram from 1903 to 1912 and of the Reading Times from 1911 to 1913. He resumed the practice of law in Reading, and was also admitted to the bar in Texas in 1920. He became engaged in oil operation in the Mid-continent Oil Field. He died in Reading in 1929. Interment in Arlington National Cemetery.

Notes

References
 Retrieved on 2008-02-10
The Political Graveyard

|-

|-

1857 births
1929 deaths
19th-century American politicians
20th-century American newspaper editors
20th-century American politicians
American military personnel of the Spanish–American War
Burials at Arlington National Cemetery
Democratic Party members of the United States House of Representatives from Pennsylvania
Editors of Pennsylvania newspapers
Journalists from Pennsylvania
Democratic Party members of the Pennsylvania House of Representatives
Pennsylvania lawyers
Democratic Party Pennsylvania state senators
Politicians from Reading, Pennsylvania
Texas lawyers
United States Army officers
Yale College alumni
19th-century American lawyers
Military personnel from Pennsylvania